Duke of San Fernando de Quiroga is a hereditary title in the Peerage of Spain, accompanied by the dignity of Grandee and granted in 1815 by Ferdinand VII to Joaquín José Melgarejo, 3rd Marquess of Melgarejo in the Kingdom of Naples and Mayordomo de semana of the king during his time as Prince of Asturias.

Such was the affection of king Ferdinand VII for the 1st Duke that he approved of his marriage with his cousin María Luisa de Borbón y Vallabriga, a daughter of the king's uncle, Infante Luis of Spain.

Dukes of San Fernando de Quiroga (1815)

Joaquín José Melgarejo y Saurín, 1st Duke of San Fernando de Quiroga
 María Virtudes de Melgarejo y Saurín, 2nd Duchess of San Fernando de Quiroga
 Francisco Javier de Losada y Melgarejo, 3rd Duke of San Fernando de Quiroga
 José María Melgarejo y Enseña, 4th Duke of San Fernando de Quiroga
 Nicolás Melgarejo y Melgarejo, 5th Duke of San Fernando de Quiroga
 Rafael Melgarejo y Tordesillas, 6th Duke of San Fernando de Quiroga
 Jaime Melgarejo y Osborne, 7th Duke of San Fernando de Quiroga
 Rafael Melgarejo y Piñar, 8th Duke of San Fernando de Quiroga
 Rafael Ignacio Melgarejo y de la Peña, 9th Duke of San Fernando de Quiroga

See also
List of dukes in the peerage of Spain
List of current Grandees of Spain

References

Dukedoms of Spain
Grandees of Spain
Lists of dukes
Lists of Spanish nobility